Thijs Waterink (born 26 December 1968) is a Dutch former professional football midfielder who played for FC Wageningen, TOP Oss, FC Den Bosch, FC Gütersloh, Arminia Bielefeld, Karlsruher SC, and SC Paderborn 07.

In 2005, he received a four-month suspension by de German Football Association for his role in the bribe scandal with referee Robert Hoyzer and his club SC Paderborn fired him. After his suspension he played until 2008 at Dutch hoofdklasse amateur club De Bataven in Gendt.

References

External links
 
 Profile 

1968 births
Living people
Footballers from Arnhem
Dutch footballers
Dutch expatriate footballers
Association football forwards
FC Wageningen players
TOP Oss players
FC Den Bosch players
Arminia Bielefeld players
Karlsruher SC players
SC Paderborn 07 players
FC Gütersloh 2000 players
Eerste Divisie players
Expatriate footballers in Germany